Hussain Faisal Al Marzooq (b. 1986), simply known as Hussain Faisal, is an Islamic eulogy reciter, music producer and composer from Bahrain.

Early life 
Faisal was born in the city of Bani Jamra, Bahrain. He is the third of five children. He graduated with a BBIS from the University of Bahrain.

Career 
Faisal started his music production and arrangement career focusing on Islamic music productions mainly in Arabic, in the start of the millennium. He also participated in general vocal coaching from time to time.

He started his Islamic recitation career in the early a few years later, and in 2014, released his first album (Ard Anishdak) gaining millions of views to his video clips on his YouTube channel. His elegies have been featured on various Islamic TV channels and aired on few Islamic radio broadcasts as well.

He recites frequently between Bahrain and Iraq, and has previously recited in Oman, Saudi Arabia, London, Lebanon and Iran.

Discography

Studio albums 

 Ard Anishdak (2014)
 Ithkirni (2015)
 Omri Ibla Wujudak
 Ya Muharram (2016)
 Tistahil Akthar
 Qisati

See also 

 Basim al-Karbalaei
 Muharram in Bahrain

References

External links 
 Faisal's Music Library at Shia Voice (in Arabic)

Living people
21st-century Bahraini male singers
1986 births